Tercan District is a district of Erzincan Province in Turkey. The municipality of Tercan is the seat and the district had a population of 16,110 in 2021.

Settlements 
Beside the seat of Tercan, the district encompasses the three municipalities of Çadırkaya, Kargın and Mercan, seventy-one villages and 122 hamlets.

Demographics 
In 1989, anthropologist Andrews counted 68 villages in the district of which Kurds were present in 54 villages and Turks in 24 villages. Same study noted that Alevis were present in 57 villages, Hanafi Muslims in 23 villages and Shafi'i Muslims in one village.

References 

Districts of Erzincan Province